The Private Secretary (Italian:La segretaria privata) is a 1931 Italian "white-telephones" musical film directed by Goffredo Alessandrini and starring Elsa Merlini, Nino Besozzi and Sergio Tofano. It was the Italian-language version of the German film Die Privatsekretärin.

Cast
 Elsa Merlini -  Elsa Lorenzi  
  Nino Besozzi - Il banchiere Roberto Berri  
  Sergio Tofano - Otello, l'usciere  
  Cesare Zoppetti - Rossi, il capo del personale  
 Umberto Sacripante - Il direttore del 'Pergolato'  
 Ermanno Roveri - Il gagà alla stazione  
 Marisa Botti - La signorina Botti, segretaria
 Renato Malavasi as Un signore che riceve uno schiaffo al 'Pergolato' 
 Alfredo Martinelli as Un cliente del 'Pergolato'  
 Noemi Orsini as Padrona della Pensione Primavera

Other film versions
 Tales of the Typewriter (December 1916, Hungary, directed by Alexander Korda)
 The Private Secretary (January 1931, Germany, directed by Wilhelm Thiele)
 Dactylo (April 1931, France, directed by Wilhelm Thiele)
 Sunshine Susie (December 1931, United Kingdom, directed by Victor Saville)
 The Private Secretary (December 1953, West Germany, directed by Paul Martin)

References

Bibliography 
Gundle, Stephen. Mussolini's Dream Factory: Film Stardom in Fascist Italy. Berghahn Books, 2013.

External links

1931 films
Italian musical comedy films
1931 musical comedy films
Films directed by Goffredo Alessandrini
1930s Italian-language films
Italian remakes of foreign films
Remakes of German films
Films based on Hungarian novels
Italian black-and-white films
Films with screenplays by Franz Schulz
1930s Italian films